Skymeter was a location-based services company that provided GPS data for pricing and traffic-information-applications. Skymeter was co-founded by Bern Grush, Kamal Hassan and Preet Khalsa and was headquartered at the MaRS Discovery District in Toronto, Ontario.

Technology
Skymeter claimed to have developed a highly accurate and reliable GPS road-use meter using a liability-critical form of GPS technology they called "Financial-grade GPS" (FGPS) to provide highly reliable charging results that ensure fairness to the user and evidentiary assurance for the toll operator. This is in contrast to conventional GPS, which tends to fail in urban areas due to the urban canyon effect. The company marketed their technology for use in road pricing, parking, car sharing/renting/leasing, usage-based vehicle insurance, fleet management and emissions metering applications.

Receivership of Skymeter Corp, December 2012 

On November 23, 2012, a “Receivership Order” was made by the Ontario Superior Court
of Justice by the MaRS Investments Accelerator Fund, pursuant to Section 243(1) of the Bankruptcy and Insolvency Act. It was accepted on December 20, 2012. The assets of Skymeter Corp were taken over by a new group led by Roger d'Hollander  and Bern Grush, called Applied Telemetrics Inc.

See also
GNSS Road Pricing
Electronic toll collection
Location-based service

References

External links

 Invitation for offers to purchase the business of Skymeter Corporation (“Skymeter”)   
 Archive of Skymeter homepage
 Article in the Toronto Star about Skymeter
 Interview on BNN TV with Skymeter CEO
 Article in GigaOm about Skymeter

Road traffic management
Electronic toll collection